Tower of Terror may refer to:

Amusement rides 
 Tower of Terror (Gold Reef City), a vertical drop roller coaster in Johannesburg, South Africa
 Tower of Terror II, a shuttle roller coaster in Queensland, Australia
 The Twilight Zone Tower of Terror, an accelerated drop tower attraction at Disney theme parks

Film and television 
 Tower of Terror (1913 film), an Italian silent film
 Tower of Terror (1941 film), a British spy thriller
 Tower of Terror (1971 film), a British thriller
 Tower of Terror (1990 film), an American action comedy
 Tower of Terror (1997 film), an American mystery film loosely based on the Disney theme park amusement ride
 "Tower of Terror" (Pokémon episode)